The 1832 United States elections elected the members of the 23rd United States Congress. Taking place during the Second Party System and a political conflict over the re-authorization of the Second Bank of the United States, the elections were contested between Andrew Jackson's Democratic Party and opponents of Jackson, including the National Republicans. Though the Democrats retained the presidency and the House, they lost their Senate majority. The Anti-Masonic Party also fielded the first notable presidential candidacy from a third party.

In the Presidential election, Democratic President Andrew Jackson easily defeated National Republican Senator Henry Clay from Kentucky. Anti-Masonic candidate William Wirt received 7% of the popular vote, the strongest popular vote showing by a third party up to that point, while Nullifier John Floyd was the first third-party candidate to win electoral votes. Jackson was the last president to win a second term until Abraham Lincoln won a second term in 1864. The first presidential nominating conventions took place during this election. Also, for the first time, every state but South Carolina chose its presidential electors via statewide popular vote.

Following the 1830 census, the House increased in size, adding 27 seats. Opponents of Jackson maintained the same number of seats, but the Democrats won several seats, increasing their majority.

In the Senate, the anti-Jackson faction won moderate gains, taking the majority in the Senate.

See also
1832 United States presidential election
1832–33 United States House of Representatives elections
1832–33 United States Senate elections

References

1832 elections in the United States
1832